The Reisseck Group or Reißeck Group is a small mountain sub-range in the Austrian state of Carinthia. As the southern part of the Ankogel Group, it belongs to the High Tauern range of the Central Eastern Alps.

Geography
Its eastern boundary is formed by the Malta and Lieser rivers with the town of Gmünd, separating it from the Gurktal Alps (Nock Mountains). To the south, it is bounded by the Möll valley and the neighbouring Kreuzeck Group.

The Reisseck Group is predominantly formed of gneisses. Other significant summits are the Tristenspitz (2,930 m), the Hohe Leier (2,774 m) and the Gmeineck (2,592 m). The Kaponig valley in the northwestern Reisseck Group has been part of the High Tauern National Park since 2005.

In the Reisseck Group there are numerous mountain lakes, of which the Radlsee (Hoher See), the Hochalmsee (Spapniksee), the Zwenberger See and Mühldorfer See are the most important. The water is used by the Reißeck-Kreuzeck Hydropower Group to supply the hydroelectric power plants in the Reißeck municipality. For tourists the mountains are accessible from the Möll valley on the Reisseck Funicular. However, service on the former Reisseck Mountain Railway connection to the mountain lakes plateau discontinued in 2014. The former ski area has been closed.

Literature 
Manfred Posch: Reißeck, Kreuzeck. Die schönsten Touren. Klagenfurt, 2000, Kärntner Druck- und Verlagsgesellschaft m.b.H.,

External links 

 
Mountain ranges of Carinthia (state)